The Atchison, Topeka, and Santa Fe Pratt Truss Bridge  in Melvern, Kansas was built in 1909.  It was listed on the National Register of Historic Places in 2003.

It is a Pratt truss bridge built by the Atchison, Topeka & Santa Fe Railroad.  It is a road bridge, bringing Pine St. over railroad tracks.

In its 2002 National Register nomination it was deemed significant as "an excellent example" of a Pratt truss bridge, which in the past was common in Kansas.  But it also "clearly illustrates the uncommon adaptation of a standard railroad truss bridge design for vehicular traffic," and as the road had only light traffic it appeared to have high potential for preservation, as it would not likely require modification or replacement.

The bridge was in "fair" condition in 2010.

References

External links

Bridges on the National Register of Historic Places in Kansas
National Register of Historic Places in Osage County, Kansas
Bridges completed in 1909
Pratt truss bridges